Jesper Mattsson may refer to:
Jesper Mattsson (ice hockey) (born 1975), a Swedish ice hockey defenceman
Jesper Mattsson (footballer) (born 1968), Swedish footballer

See also
Jesper Mattson (born 1995), a Swedish ice hockey defenceman